Heilig is a German family name.

Those with the name include:
  (1902–1943), German economist
  (1914–1978), Nazi politician
  (1888–1968), Austrian journalist
  (1892–1975), photographer, father of Walter Heilig
  (1925–2006), East-German photographer (see c:Category:Walter Heilig)
  (1826–1888), businessman, mayor and member of Reichstag
  (1817–1849), revolutionary in 1848
 Morton Heilig (1926–1997), American cinematographer
  (born 1956), German Green politician

German-language surnames